Tad Skylar Agoglia (born 22 May 1976) is originally from Long Island, NY. Agoglia is an entrepreneur and humanitarian. He is the chairman and founder of The First Response Team of America, a nonprofit organization providing immediate disaster relief and recovery services to communities using specialized heavy equipment and a travelling crew of highly trained responders.

Early life 
Agoglia was born in Queens, NY and grew up on Long Island, NY. Agoglia first started working at age 12, pumping gas. He was a successful entrepreneur by the time he was in high school, building various businesses in landscaping, snow plowing, Christmas tree farming, and contracting.

Career 
Prior to creating the First Response Team of America, Agoglia had a successful and lucrative excavation and crane company. His then for-profit company, Disaster Recovery Solutions LLC, operated on the highly profitable debris removal contracts working in the aftermath of large-scale disasters. Typically, Agoglia and his crew wouldn't start their work in the ravaged communities until months after the initial devastation, after the contracts had been finalized.

In May 2007, Agoglia and his crew were in the middle of a contracting job in Missouri when an EF-5 tornado leveled the town of Greensburg, Kansas, destroying 95% of the community. He left Missouri with his equipment from his LLC, and started toward what was left of Greensburg. Greensburg's already limited resources were either destroyed or inaccessible to its firefighters and the town was in desperate need for Agoglia's uniquely specialized equipment. Fortuitously, Agoglia had brought the exact machinery needed to clear the roads of debris and power lines, and helping the firefighters access their firehouse and equipment. Agoglia spent weeks in Greensburg, assisting families to clear debris from their home sites.

From that Greensburg storm moving forward, Agoglia and his Team travelled from one disaster zone to the next, offering their assistance to every community they could, for no charge. The first 2 years of the not-for-profit work operated using over $1 million worth of equipment from Disaster Recovery Solutions LLC and also from Agoglia's personal life's savings of over $1 million; a pocket of wealth earned not solely from the LLC, but also first pennies earned since he started working at just 12 years old. Responding pro bono to 18 communities in those 2 years, Agoglia felt fulfilled but was financially depleted. Entering the financial crisis of 2007–08, it was poor timing to launch an official non-profit dependent on donor assistance.

In planning a more specialized fleet for the newly founded charity, Agoglia went to a Peterbilt dealership in Baltimore, with the intentions of buying a new truck. He met the dealership President, John Arscott, who was inspired by his story. In the midst of the recession, he insisted that Agoglia take 3 Peterbilt trucks of his choosing for only the promise that one day, John and his sons could join Agoglia in a response.

Presently, Agoglia's organization relies on individual and private donations to continue responding to communities across the US affected by large-scale disasters.

In 2008, Agoglia was chosen as a CNN Top Ten Hero of the Year and featured as People Magazine's Heroes Among Us.

In 2010, Agoglia was presented with the Jefferson Award for Public Service and recognized in GQ Magazine's Better Men Better World Search.

In 2015, Agoglia was awarded the Extraordinary Commitment of Service to the Community Award by the RUMI Forum of Washington, DC.

Agoglia and his organization have received recognition from MSNBC, CNN, The Wall Street Journal, PBS, USA Today, U.S. News & World Report, Good Morning America, and Men's Health, among many others.

First Response Team of America
From its inception until presently (2015), the FRTA has responded to 84 communities in the US and to Haiti for the 2010 earthquake. The Team specializes in confined space search and rescue, swift water rescue, powering critical infrastructure, and quick-response debris removal.

The organization derived from Agoglia's previous business, Disaster Recovery Solutions LLC, a crane company that operated on debris removal government contracts after large-scale disasters.

In May 2007, Disaster Recovery Solutions was working a contracting job in Missouri when an EF-5 tornado leveled the town of Greensburg, Kansas, destroying 95% of the community. The town's limited resources were destroyed and/or inaccessible to its firefighters and the town was in need of specialized heavy equipment. Agoglia left the contract job in Missouri and brought machinery to clear the roads of debris and power lines, helping the firefighters access their firehouse and equipment. In the following days and weeks, home sites and crucial buildings were cleared for families and the community.

References 

 2008 CNN Heroes. Retrieved 26 January 2016.
 Floods: U.S. 'deserves this type of response'. June 20, 2008. Retrieved 22 January 2016.
 National Council on Readiness and Preparation. 20 June 2008. Retrieved 22 July 2014.
 National Conference for Secure Communities. 20 June 2008. Retrieved on 04 September 2009.
 People Magazine: 'After The Flood: In ravaged midwestern towns, Tad Agoglia comes in with a cleanup brigade'. 6 July 2008 Vol 70 (pg. 64). Retrieved 15 October 2010.
 'The Pete Store Gives Back: The Pete Store donates trucks to Non-Profit First Response Team of America'. 10 July 2009. Retrieved 27 January 2016.
 Men's Health: 'Every Day Heroes: In the Eye of the Storm'. 23 October 2013. Retrieved 22 January 2016.
 GQ Magazine: Better Men Better World Search 2010. 5 August 2010. Retrieved 12 December 2012.
 The Weather Channel: 'Riches to Rags'. 26 February 2015. Retrieved 28 February 2015.
 Wall Street Journal: 'Ex-Contractor Seeks Corporate Cash To Continue Disaster Aid Firm'. 16 August 2010. Retrieved 19 August 2011.

External links 
 The First Response Team of America official website

Philanthropists from New York (state)
Living people
1976 births
People from Long Island
People from Queens, New York